Voltige may refer to:
 La Voltige, a French short black-and-white silent documentary film 
 Equestrian vaulting, or acrobatics on horseback